The 2012 Seattle Sounders FC season was the club's fourth season in Major League Soccer, the United States' top-tier of professional soccer. For the Sounders FC organization, it was their fourth year of existence, and including all previous clubs, it was the 32nd season of a soccer team bearing the Sounders name.

Season overview

Pre-season
On November 23, 2011, James Riley was drafted away from Seattle by the Montreal Impact as part of the 2011 MLS Expansion Draft. He was immediately traded to Chivas USA with allocation money for Justin Braun and Gerson Mayen. The Sounders also traded Tyson Wahl to the Impact for allocation money. Other off-season transactions included the transfer of Erik Friberg to Malmö FF, the retirements of Kasey Keller, Terry Boss, and Taylor Graham, the release of Nate Jaqua and Pat Noonan, the acquisition of Marc Burch from D.C. United via the 2011 MLS Re-Entry Draft, and the signings of out of contract players Michael Gspurning and Adam Johansson.

In the 2012 MLS SuperDraft, the Sounders took Creighton University defender Andrew Duran in the first round and University of Alabama-Birmingham forward Babayele Sodade. A week later, in the 2012 MLS Supplemental Draft the Sounders took University of California-Santa Barbara defender Tim Pontius and former Leicester City F.C. forward Jason Banton in the second round, University of Washington forward Abdul Aman in the third round, and Cal Poly defender Wes Feighner in the fourth round. On the same day as the Supplemental Draft, the Sounders traded the rights to defender Leone Cruz, whom the Sounders acquired in the second round of the 2011 MLS SuperDraft but did not sign to a contract, to Real Salt Lake for UCLA defender Andy Rose, whom Real Salt Lake had drafted in the first round of the Supplemental Draft.

Club

Coaching staff

Other information

Official sponsors
Xbox 360
Adidas
Samsung Mob!le
Seattle Bank
Virginia Mason Medical Center
Root Sports

Kits

Squad

Current squad

Squad information
As of November 18, 2012.

Player movement

Transfers

In

Loan in

On Trial

Out

Loan out

On Trial

No Longer On Trial

Unsigned draft picks

Match results

Pre-season

Seattle Sounders FC Community Shield

Other training games

Overall

CONCACAF Champions League

2011–12 edition

2012–13 edition 

Group 4

Match results

MLS regular season

Table 
Western Conference

Overall

Results summary

Results by round

Match results

MLS Cup Playoffs

U.S. Open Cup

World Football Challenge

Cascadia Cup

The Cascadia Cup is a trophy that was created in 2004 by supporters of the Portland Timbers, Seattle Sounders FC and Vancouver Whitecaps FC. It is awarded to the club with the best record in league games versus the other participants.

Squad statistics

Appearances and goals

|-
|colspan="14"|Players who left the club during the season: (Statistics shown are the appearances made and goals scored while at Seattle Sounders)

Top scorers
Includes all competitive matches. The list is sorted by shirt number when total goals are equal.

{| class="wikitable" style="font-size: 95%; text-align: center;"
|-
!width=15 style="background:#5d9731; color:white; text-align:center;"|
!width=15 style="background:#5d9731; color:white; text-align:center;"|
!width=15 style="background:#5d9731; color:white; text-align:center;"|
!width=15 style="background:#5d9731; color:white; text-align:center;"|
!width=226 style="background:#5d9731; color:white; text-align:center;"|Name
!width=130 style="background:#5d9731; color:white; text-align:center;"|Major League Soccer
!width=80 style="background:#5d9731; color:white; text-align:center;"|Playoffs
!width=120 style="background:#5d9731; color:white; text-align:center;"|Champions League
!width=90 style="background:#5d9731; color:white; text-align:center;"|U.S. Open Cup
!width=80 style="background:#5d9731; color:white; text-align:center;"|Total
|-
|rowspan=2|1
|7
|FW
|
|Eddie Johnson
|14
|1
|1
|1
|17
|-
|17
|FW
|
|Fredy Montero
|13
|0
|2
|2
|17
|-
|rowspan=1|3
|26
|FW
|
|Sammy Ochoa
|1
|0
|4
|3
|8
|-
|rowspan=2|4
|3
|MF
|
|Brad Evans
|4
|0
|2
|1
|7
|-
|16
|MF
|
|David Estrada
|5
|0
|2
|0
|7
|-
|rowspan=1|6
|6
|MF
|
|Osvaldo Alonso
|1
|0
|0
|4
|5
|-
|rowspan=1|7
|25
|MF
|
|Andy Rose
|1
|0
|1
|2
|4
|-
|rowspan=5|8
|10
|MF
|
|Mauro Rosales
|3
|0
|0
|0
|3
|-
|15
|MF
|
|Álvaro Fernández
|2
|0
|1
|0
|3
|-
|20
|DF
|
|Zach Scott
|1
|1
|0
|1
|3
|-
|27
|MF
|
|Alex Caskey
|1
|0
|1
|1
|3
|-
|
|
|
|
|3
|0
|0
|0
|3
|-
|rowspan=1|13
|11
|MF
|
|Steve Zakuani
|1
|0
|1
|0
|2
|-
|rowspan=3|14
|4
|DF
|
|Patrick Ianni
|1
|0
|0
|0
|1
|-
|15
|MF
|
|Mario Martínez
|0
|1
|0
|0
|1
|-
|-
|21
|FW
|
|Cordell Cato
|0
|0
|0
|1
|1
|-
|colspan="4"|
! style="background:#1047AB; color:white; text-align:center;"|TOTALS
! style="background:#1047AB; color:white; text-align:center;"|51
! style="background:#1047AB; color:white; text-align:center;"|3
! style="background:#1047AB; color:white; text-align:center;"|15
! style="background:#1047AB; color:white; text-align:center;"|16
! style="background:#1047AB; color:white; text-align:center;"|85

Italic: denotes no longer with club.

Clean sheets
Includes all competitive matches. The list is sorted by shirt number when total clean sheets are equal.

{| class="wikitable" style="font-size: 95%; text-align: center;"
|-
!width=15 style="background:#5d9731; color:white; text-align:center;"| 
!width=15 style="background:#5d9731; color:white; text-align:center;"| 
!width=15 style="background:#5d9731; color:white; text-align:center;"|
!width=15 style="background:#5d9731; color:white; text-align:center;"|
!width=150 style="background:#5d9731; color:white; text-align:center;"|Name
!width=130 style="background:#5d9731; color:white; text-align:center;"|Major League Soccer
!width=80 style="background:#5d9731; color:white; text-align:center;"|Playoffs
!width=120 style="background:#5d9731; color:white; text-align:center;"|Champions League
!width=90 style="background:#5d9731; color:white; text-align:center;"|U.S. Open Cup
!width=80 style="background:#5d9731; color:white; text-align:center;"|Total
|-
|rowspan=1|1
|1
|GK
|
|Michael Gspurning
|9
|2
|0
|0
|11
|-
|rowspan=1|2
|35
|GK
|
|Bryan Meredith
|3
|0
|0
|1
|4
|-
|rowspan=1|3
|33
|GK
|
|Andrew Weber
|0
|0
|0
|1
|1
|-
|rowspan=2|4
|24
|GK
|
|Marcus Hahnemann
|0
|0
|0
|0
|0
|-
|29
|GK
|
|Josh Ford
|0
|0
|0
|0
|0
|-
|colspan="4"|
! style="background:#1047AB; color:white; text-align:center;"|TOTALS
! style="background:#1047AB; color:white; text-align:center;"|12
! style="background:#1047AB; color:white; text-align:center;"|2
! style="background:#1047AB; color:white; text-align:center;"|0
! style="background:#1047AB; color:white; text-align:center;"|2
! style="background:#1047AB; color:white; text-align:center;"|16

Italic: denotes no longer with club.

Disciplinary record
Includes all competitive matches. The list is sorted by shirt number when total cards are equal.

{| class="wikitable" style="font-size: 95%; text-align: center;"
|-
| rowspan="2"  style="width:2.5%;background:#5d9731; text-align:center; color:white;"|
| rowspan="2"  style="width:3%;background:#5d9731; text-align:center; color:white;"|
| rowspan="2"  style="width:3%;background:#5d9731; text-align:center; color:white;"|
| rowspan="2"  style="width:3%;background:#5d9731; text-align:center; color:white;"|
| rowspan="2"  style="width:15%;background:#5d9731; text-align:center; color:white;"|Name
| colspan="3" style="text-align:center;background:#5d9731; color:white;"|Major League Soccer
| colspan="3" style="text-align:center;background:#5d9731; color:white;"|Playoffs
| colspan="3" style="text-align:center;background:#5d9731; color:white;"|Champions League
| colspan="3" style="text-align:center;background:#5d9731; color:white;"|U.S. Open Cup
| colspan="3" style="text-align:center;background:#5d9731; color:white;"|Total
|-
!  style="width:25px; background:#fe9;"|
!  style="width:28px; background:#ff8888;"|
!  style="width:25px; background:#ff8888;"|
!  style="width:25px; background:#fe9;"|
!  style="width:28px; background:#ff8888;"|
!  style="width:25px; background:#ff8888;"|
!  style="width:25px; background:#fe9;"|
!  style="width:28px; background:#ff8888;"|
!  style="width:25px; background:#ff8888;"|
!  style="width:25px; background:#fe9;"|
!  style="width:28px; background:#ff8888;"|
!  style="width:25px; background:#ff8888;"|
!  style="width:35px; background:#fe9;"|
!  style="width:35px; background:#ff8888;"|
!  style="width:35px; background:#ff8888;"|
|-
|rowspan=1|1
|6
|MF
|
|Osvaldo Alonso
|8
|0
|0
|3
|1
|0
|0
|0
|0
|3
|0
|0
|14
|1
|0
|-
|rowspan=1|2
|20
|DF
|
|Zach Scott
|6
|1
|0
|0
|0
|0
|1
|0
|0
|1
|0
|0
|8
|1
|0
|-
|rowspan=1|3
|17
|FW
|
|Fredy Montero
|5
|0
|1
|0
|0
|0
|2
|0
|0
|0
|0
|0
|7
|0
|1
|-
|rowspan=1|4
|7
|FW
|
|Eddie Johnson
|6
|0
|0
|1
|0
|0
|0
|0
|0
|0
|0
|0
|7
|0
|0
|-
|rowspan=4|5
|8
|DF
|
|Marc Burch
|3
|0
|0
|0
|0
|0
|0
|0
|0
|2
|0
|0
|5
|0
|0
|-
|12
|DF
|
|Leonardo González
|3
|0
|0
|0
|0
|0
|2
|0
|0
|0
|0
|0
|5
|0
|0
|-
|25
|MF
|
|Andy Rose
|4
|0
|0
|0
|0
|0
|0
|0
|0
|1
|0
|0
|5
|0
|0
|-
|34
|DF
|
|Jhon Kennedy Hurtado
|2
|0
|1
|1
|0
|0
|1
|0
|0
|0
|0
|0
|4
|0
|1
|-
|rowspan=3|9
|4
|DF
|
|Patrick Ianni
|0
|0
|0
|0
|0
|0
|1
|0
|0
|2
|1
|0
|3
|1
|0
|-
|13
|MF
|
|Christian Tiffert
|4
|0
|0
|0
|0
|0
|0
|0
|0
|0
|0
|0
|4
|0
|0
|-
|31
|DF
|
|Jeff Parke
|3
|0
|0
|1
|0
|0
|0
|0
|0
|0
|0
|0
|4
|0
|0
|-
|rowspan=1|12
|3
|MF
|
|Brad Evans
|2
|0
|0
|1
|0
|0
|0
|0
|0
|0
|0
|0
|3
|0
|0
|-
|rowspan=4|13
|10
|MF
|
|Mauro Rosales
|1
|0
|0
|0
|0
|0
|0
|0
|0
|1
|0
|0
|2
|0
|0
|-
|15
|MF
|
|Álvaro Fernández
|1
|0
|1
|0
|0
|0
|0
|0
|0
|0
|0
|0
|1
|0
|1
|-
|16
|MF
|
|David Estrada
|1
|0
|0
|0
|0
|0
|1
|0
|0
|0
|0
|0
|2
|0
|0
|-
|23
|MF
|
|Servando Carrasco
|1
|0
|0
|0
|0
|0
|1
|0
|0
|0
|0
|0
|2
|0
|0
|-
|rowspan=5|17
|1
|GK
|
|Michael Gspurning
|0
|0
|0
|0
|0
|0
|1
|0
|0
|0
|0
|0
|1
|0
|0
|-
|5
|DF
|
|Adam Johansson
|1
|0
|0
|0
|0
|0
|0
|0
|0
|0
|0
|0
|1
|0
|0
|-
|15
|MF
|
|Mario Martínez
|1
|0
|0
|0
|0
|0
|0
|0
|0
|0
|0
|0
|1
|0
|0
|-
|26
|FW
|
|Sammy Ochoa
|0
|0
|0
|0
|0
|0
|0
|0
|0
|1
|0
|0
|1
|0
|0
|-
|28
|MF
|
|Christian Sivebæk
|1
|0
|0
|0
|0
|0
|0
|0
|0
|0
|0
|0
|1
|0
|0
|-
|colspan="4"|
! style="background:#1047AB; color:white; text-align:center;"|TOTALS
! style="background:#1047AB; color:white; text-align:center;"|53
! style="background:#1047AB; color:white; text-align:center;"|1
! style="background:#1047AB; color:white; text-align:center;"|3
! style="background:#1047AB; color:white; text-align:center;"|7
! style="background:#1047AB; color:white; text-align:center;"|1
! style="background:#1047AB; color:white; text-align:center;"|0
! style="background:#1047AB; color:white; text-align:center;"|10
! style="background:#1047AB; color:white; text-align:center;"|0
! style="background:#1047AB; color:white; text-align:center;"|0
! style="background:#1047AB; color:white; text-align:center;"|11
! style="background:#1047AB; color:white; text-align:center;"|1
! style="background:#1047AB; color:white; text-align:center;"|0
! style="background:#1047AB; color:white; text-align:center;"|81
! style="background:#1047AB; color:white; text-align:center;"|3
! style="background:#1047AB; color:white; text-align:center;"|3
|-

Italic: denotes no longer with club.

Captains
Accounts for all competitions. Last updated on November 18, 2012.

Team statistics
{|class="wikitable" style="text-align: center;"
|-
! style="background:#5d9731; color:white; text-align:center;"| !! style="background:#5d9731; color:white; text-align:center;"|Total !! style="background:#5d9731; color:white; text-align:center;"|Home !! style="background:#5d9731; color:white; text-align:center;"|Away
|-
|align=left| Games played || 49 || 25 || 24
|-
|align=left| Games won    || 26 || 18 || 8
|-
|align=left| Games drawn  || 12 || 3 || 9
|-
|align=left| Games lost   || 11 || 4 || 7
|-
|align=left| Biggest win  || 5–0 v Cal FC|| 5–0 v Cal FC|| 6–2 v Chivas USA
|-
|align=left| Biggest loss || 1–6 v Santos Laguna || 0–2 v Columbus Crew || 1–6 v Santos Laguna
|-
|align=left| Biggest win (League) || 4–0 v Los Angeles Galaxy6–2 v Chivas USA|| 4–0 v Los Angeles Galaxy|| 6–2 v Chivas USA
|-
|align=left| Biggest win (Playoffs) || 1–0 v Real Salt Lake2–1 v Los Angeles Galaxy || 2–1 v Los Angeles Galaxy || 1–0 v Real Salt Lake
|-
|align=left| Biggest win (North America) || 3–1 v Caledonia AIA3–1 v Marathón|| 3–1 v Caledonia AIA3–1 v Marathón|| 3–1 v Caledonia AIA
|-
|align=left| Biggest win (Cup) || 5–0 v Cal FC || 5–0 v Cal FC || 1–0 v San Jose Earthquakes
|-
|align=left| Biggest loss (League) || 1–4 v Montreal Impact || 0–2 v Columbus Crew || 1–4 v Montreal Impact
|-
|align=left| Biggest loss (Playoffs) || 0–3 v Los Angeles Galaxy || n/a || 0–3 v Los Angeles Galaxy
|-
|align=left| Biggest loss (North America) || 1–6 v Santos Laguna || n/a || 1–6 v Santos Laguna
|-
|align=left| Biggest loss (Cup) || 1(2)–1(3) v Sporting Kansas City || n/a || 1(2)–1(3) v Sporting Kansas City
|-
|align=left| Clean sheets || 16 || 10 || 6
|-
|align=left| Goals scored || 85 || 51 || 34
|-
|align=left| Goals conceded || 52 || 17 || 35
|-
|align=left| Goal difference || +33 || +34 || −1
|-
|-
|-
|align=left| Yellow cards || 81 || 37 || 44
|-
|align=left| Red cards || 6 || 3 || 3
|-
|align=left| Most appearances ||align=left|Montero (45) ||align=left|Alonso (24)||align=left| Johnson (22)Montero (22)
|-
|align=left| Top scorer ||align=left| Johnson (17)Montero (17)||align=left|Johnson (9)||align=left|Montero (10)
|-
|align=left |Worst discipline ||align=left|Alonso 14  1 ||align=left|Alonso 8  1 ||align=left|Alonso 6 Montero 5  1 
|-
|align=left|Penalties for ||  4/4  ||  4/4  ||  0/0  
|-
|align=left|Penalties against ||  8/8  ||  3/3  ||  5/5 
|-
|align=left| Points (League) ||  || || 
|-
|align=left| Winning rate|| ||  || 
|-

International call-ups

Awards 

Sounders FC Team Award Recipients

MLS Goal of the Year

MLS Comeback Player of the Year

MLS Best XI

U.S. Open Cup Player of the Tournament

MLS Player of the Week

MLS Team of the Week

MLS Goal of the Week

MLS All-Stars 2012

Castrol Index Top 25 performers

24 Under 24

MLS W.O.R.K.S. Humanitarian of the Month

Reserves

MLS Reserves League

League table
West Division

Match results

Miscellany

Allocation ranking 
Seattle is in the No. 15 position in the MLS Allocation Ranking. The allocation ranking is the mechanism used to determine which MLS club has first priority to acquire a U.S. National Team player who signs with MLS after playing abroad, or a former MLS player who returns to the league after having gone to a club abroad for a transfer fee. A ranking can be traded, provided that part of the compensation received in return is another club's ranking.

International roster slots 

Seattle has eight MLS International Roster Slots for use in the 2012 season. Each club in Major League Soccer is allocated eight international roster spots and no trades involving Seattle have been reported.

Future draft picks

References 

Seattle Sounders FC seasons
Seattle Sounders Football Club
Seattle Sounders FC